In 18th- and 19th-century German philosophy, a Zeitgeist  ("spirit of the age") is an invisible agent, force or Daemon dominating the characteristics of a given epoch in world history.

The term is usually associated with Georg W. F. Hegel, contrasting with Hegel's use of Volksgeist "national spirit" and Weltgeist "world-spirit". 
Its coinage and popularization precedes Hegel, and is mostly due to Herder and Goethe. Other philosophers who were associated with such concepts include Spencer and Voltaire.

Contemporary use of the term sometimes, more colloquially, refers to a schema of fashions or fads that prescribes what is considered to be acceptable or tasteful for an era: e.g., in the field of architecture.

Theory of leadership

Hegel in Phenomenology of the Spirit (1807) uses both Weltgeist and Volksgeist, but prefers the phrase Geist der Zeiten "spirit of the times" over the compound Zeitgeist.

The Hegelian concept contrasts with the Great Man theory as by Thomas Carlyle, which sees history as the result of the actions of heroes and geniuses, as Hegel perceived such "great men", specifically Napoleon, as the "embodiment of the world-spirit" (Die Weltseele zu Pferde "the world-soul on horseback"). Carlyle stresses that leaders do not become leaders by fate or accident. Instead, these individuals possess characteristics of great leaders and these characteristics allow them to obtain positions of power.

According to Hegel biographer D. R.  Forsyth, Leo Tolstoy disagreed with Carlyle's perspective, instead believing that leadership, like other things, was a product of the "zeitgeist", the social circumstances at the time.

Great Man theory and zeitgeist theory may be included in two main areas of thought in psychology. For instance, Great Man theory is very similar to the trait approach. Trait researchers are interested in identifying the various personality traits that underline human behaviors such as conformity, leadership, or other social behaviors. Thus, they agree that leadership is primarily a quality of an individual and that some people are pre-dispositioned to be a leader whereas others are born to follow these leaders. In contrast, situationist researchers believe that social behavior is a product of society. That is, social influence is what determines human behaviors. Therefore, situationism is of the same opinion as zeitgeist theory—leaders are created from the social environment and are molded from the situation. The concept of zeitgeist also relates to the sociological tradition that stems from Émile Durkheim and recently developed into social capital theory as exemplified by the work of Patrick Hunout.

These two perspectives have been combined to create what is known as the interactional approach to leadership. This approach asserts that leadership is developed through the mixing of personality traits and the situation. Further, this approach was expressed by social psychologist, Kurt Lewin, by the equation B = f(P, E) where behavior (B) is a function (f) of the person (P) and the environment (E).

In self-help and business models
Executives, venture capitalists, journalists, and authors have argued that the idea of a zeitgeist is useful in understanding the emergence of industries, simultaneous invention, and evaluating the relative value of innovations. Malcolm Gladwell argued in his book, Outliers, that entrepreneurs who succeeded often share similar characteristics—early personal or significant exposure to knowledge and skills in the early stages of a nascent industry. He proposed that the timing of involvement in an industry, and often in sports as well, affected the probability of success. In Silicon Valley, a number of people (Peter Thiel, Alistair Davidson, Mac Levchin, Nicholas G. Carr, Vinod Khosla) have argued that much innovation has been shaped by easy access to the Internet, open source software, component technologies for both hardware and software (e.g., software libraries, software as a service), and the ability to reach narrow markets across a global market. Peter Thiel has commented: "There is so much incrementalism now."

In a zeitgeist market, the number of new entrants is high, differentiation in high value products (the strongest predictor of new product success) is more difficult to achieve, and business models emphasizing service and solution over product and process, will enhance success. Examples include innovation in product experience, legal rights and bundling, privacy rights, and agency (where businesses act on behalf of customers).

Aesthetic fashion 
 Hegel believed that art reflected, by its very nature, the culture of the time in which it is created. Culture and art are inextricable because an individual artist is a product of his or her time and therefore brings that culture to any given work of art. Furthermore, he believed that in the modern world it was impossible to produce classical art, which he believed represented a "free and ethical culture", which depended more on the philosophy of art and theory of art, rather than a reflection of the social construct, or Zeitgeist in which a given artist lives.

This use of zeitgeist is taken  in the sense of intellectual or aesthetic fashion or fad. Research from empirical aesthetics investigated the relation between zeitgeist as temporal context and the evaluation of creative works. In a study of the musical originality of 15,618 classical music themes, the importance of objective characteristics and zeitgeist for popularity was examined. Both the musical originality of a theme relative to its contemporary works (the zeitgeist), as well as its "absolute" originality influenced in similar magnitude the popularity of a theme. Similarly, objective features and temporal context both influenced the evaluation of linguistic originality.

See also
  
 Volksgeist "national spirit"
 Weltgeist "world-spirit"

References

External links

Christian Adolph Klotz
Christian Adolf Klotz in: Meyers Konversations-Lexikon, 4. Aufl., 1888, Vol. 9, Page 859

Concepts in the philosophy of history
German words and phrases